Marian Jade Saldajeno Capadocia (born September 17, 1995) is a tennis player from the Philippines.

Junior career
She began playing tennis at the age of 8 and started her professional career at the age of 15. Born in Manila, she reached her highest individual ranking in the Philippines in 2011, when she became number one. She lit the cauldron to start the 2017 Palarong Pambansa.

ITF finals

Doubles (1–0)

References

External links
 
 

1995 births
Living people
Filipino female tennis players
Sportspeople from Antique (province)
Southeast Asian Games bronze medalists for the Philippines
Southeast Asian Games medalists in tennis
Tennis players at the 2018 Asian Games
Competitors at the 2011 Southeast Asian Games
Asian Games competitors for the Philippines
Competitors at the 2021 Southeast Asian Games